Sir George Jefford Fowler (14 August 1858 – 19 October 1937) was an English solicitor who served as Chief Magistrate for Kingston upon Thames for thirty years.

Fowler was born in Exeter and admitted a solicitor (like his father) in 1879. He was knighted in the 1920 New Year Honours for his services as a magistrate and retired as senior partner of Fowler, Legg & Co, Bedford Row, London, in 1931.

Footnotes

References
Obituary, The Times, 20 October 1937

1858 births
1937 deaths
English solicitors
Knights Bachelor
Lawyers from Exeter